The Domino Effect in New Orleans on May 30, 2009 was a tribute concert celebrating the life and influence of Rock and roll legend Fats Domino. A portion of the proceeds were to benefit the Brees Dream Foundation, bettering local playgrounds and outdoor recreation sites for the children of New Orleans.

Fats Domino is working with NFL quarterback Drew Brees of the New Orleans Saints to raise money for the foundation’s "Operation Kids: Rebuilding Dreams" campaign, which supports education and mentoring programs as well as rebuilds athletic fields and parks. To date, the Brees Dream Foundation has donated over $1.6 million to various efforts supporting the New Orleans community.

Line-Up
(In no specific order)
B.B. King
Chuck Barry
Little Richard
Taj Mahal
Keb' Mo'
Ozomatli
Wyclef Jean
Junior Brown

External links
http://www.dominoeffectnola.com
http://www.myspace.com/thedominoeffectnola
http://www.dominoeffectrovia.com
http://www.neworleansarena.com
http://www.drewbrees.com
http://www.operationkids.com

Press Releases
USA Today
The Times-Picayune
NewOrleans.com
Live Daily
BlueHaze
Newstin
nola38
Shreveport Times

Notes

Tribute concerts in the United States
2009 in Louisiana
May 2009 events in the United States